Apatelodes pandara is a moth in the family Apatelodidae first described by Herbert Druce in 1898. It is found in Costa Rica.

References

Apatelodidae
Moths described in 1898